The International Mars Exploration Working Group (IMEWG) is an organization of all major space agencies and institutions participating in the exploration of the planet Mars.  Conceived in 1993, the working group meets twice per year to discuss an international strategy for the exploration of Mars.

References 

Exploration of Mars